Deoksungsan is a mountain of Chungcheongnam-do, western South Korea. It has an elevation of 495 metres.

Attractions
 Sudeoksa, a Korean Buddhist temple, it offers visitors a "Temple Stay Program".

See also
List of mountains of Korea

References

Mountains of South Korea
Mountains of South Chungcheong Province